The 2011–12 season was Motherwell's thirteenth consecutive season in the Scottish Premier League, having competed in it since its inauguration in 1998–99. Motherwell finished 3rd in the league, qualifying for the UEFA Champions League, were knocked out of the Scottish Cup at the Quarter-Finals stage by Aberdeen, and knocked out at the 3rd Round stage by Hibernian in the League Cup.

Important Events

 24 July 2011 - The club announce a new sponsorship deal with worldwide franchised retail network, Cash Converters.
 2 August 2011 - Draw for the Scottish League Cup second round. Motherwell draw Clyde (away).
 29 August 2011 - Draw for the Scottish League Cup third round. Motherwell draw Hibernian (home).
 22 November 2011 - Draw for the Scottish Cup fourth round. Motherwell draw Queen's Park (home).
 9 January 2012 - Draw for the Scottish Cup fifth round. Motherwell draw Greenock Morton (home).
 10 January 2012 - Vice-Chairman Bill Dickie dies. Dickie was a Motherwell board member for over 30 years and was also the president of the SFA from 1993 to 1997.
 7 February 2012 - Draw for the Scottish Cup Quarter-finals. Motherwell draw Aberdeen (home).

Transfers

In

Out 

 Devlin's transfer was announced on the above date but were not finalised until 1 July.

Loans in

Loans out

Released

Motherwell F.C. Season 2011-12 First-team Squad
Updated 3 January 2012

Motherwell F.C. Season 2011-12 Statistics

Appearances
Updated 13 May 2012

|}

2011-12 Motherwell Top scorers

Last updated on 28 April 2012

2011-12 Motherwell Disciplinary Record 

Last updated 13 May 2012

Awards

Player of the Month

Manager of the Month

Young player of the Month

Results and fixtures

Friendlies

Scottish Premier League

Scottish Cup

Scottish League Cup

Competitions

Overall

SPL

Classification

Results summary

Results by round

Results by opponent

Source: 2011–12 Scottish Premier League Results Table

See also
 List of Motherwell F.C. seasons

Notes and references

External links
 Motherwell F.C. Website
 BBC My Club Page
 Motherwell F.C. Newsnow

Motherwell F.C. seasons
Motherwell